Neos (registered as Neos S.p.A.) is an Italian airline, headquartered in Somma Lombardo, Lombardy. It is a subsidiary of Alpitour S.p.A. It operates a fleet of Boeing 737 Next Generation, 737 MAX and Boeing 787 aircraft to over 73 scheduled domestic, European and intercontinental destinations. The airline operates from its main hub at Milan Malpensa Airport.

History 

Neos was established on 22 June 2001, as a joint venture between two tourism companies, the Italian Alpitour S.p.A. and the German TUI Group. Revenue flights were launched on 8 March 2002. In January 2004, Alpitour bought all of TUI Group's shares, making Neos a fully owned subsidiary of Alpitour no longer affiliated with TUI.

For many years Neos has been working with Costa Cruises to transport passengers from Italy to Dubai, the Caribbean, and northern Europe at Costa's ships' departure and arrival points.

In January 2011, Neos' fleet was increased in size to six aircraft. In 2014, Neos ordered three Boeing 787-8s. These orders were later converted into four larger 787-9s for then to be added in 2020 with another 2 taken up from Norwegian Air International. Neos became the first Italian operator of the Boeing 787 when its first 787-9 entered service on 25 December 2017.

Neos Air also received later on 30 March 2021 its first 2 Boeing 737 MAX 8 for then to later receive another 2 on 8 June 2021 adding the tally to 4 737 MAX 8 to the fleet.

Destinations

Neos operates flights to destinations in southern Europe, Africa, Asia, the Caribbean, Brazil, USA, Mexico, and Kazakhstan.

Codeshare agreements
Neos has codeshare agreements with the following airlines:

 Albawings
 easyJet
 ITA Airways

Fleet

Current fleet
, the Neos fleet consists of the following Boeing aircraft:

Retired fleet

Incidents
 On 19 November 2012, Neos Flight 731, a Boeing 767-300ER, suffered severe turbulence during a flight from Holguín to Milan. A total of 66 passengers sustained minor injuries.

See also
List of airlines of Italy
List of charter airlines

References

External links

Airlines of Italy
Airlines established in 2001
Charter airlines
Somma Lombardo
Italian companies established in 2001